Melih Mahmutoğlu (born 12 May 1990) is a Turkish professional basketball player and the team captain for Fenerbahçe of the Turkish Basketball Super League and the EuroLeague.

Club career

Early years
Mahmutoğlu started to play youth basketball with Genç Boğaziçispor. He transferred to the youth clubs of Efes Pilsen in 1999, and he was developed in the Efes Pilsen junior clubs. He made his professional debut in the Turkish Second Division with Pertevniyal, Efes Pilsen's feeder club, during the 2007–08 season.

He signed a contract with Darüşşafaka in 2008. He averaged 7.3 points and 1.4 rebounds with them in the Turkish First Division, in the 2008–09 season.

He signed a contract with Galatasaray in 2010. He was loaned to Antalya BB for the 2011–12 season, where he averaged 11.8 points, 1.9 rebounds, and 1.0 assists per game in the top-tier level Turkish League.

In the summer of 2012, he moved to Erdemirspor. Mahmutoğlu's scoring average with Erdemirspor, of 12.2 points per game, over 30 games played in the Turkish League's 2012–13 season, drew the attention of some bigger European clubs towards him.

Fenerbahçe (2013–present)
In August 2013, Mahmutoğlu signed a two-year contract with an option to extend it for one more season, with Fenerbahçe. In his first EuroLeague season, he averaged 5.5 points and 1.2 rebounds per game, over 22 games, while shooting 44.8% from the field.

In the 2014–15 season, Fenerbahçe advanced to the EuroLeague Final Four, for the first time in the team's history. On 15 May 2015 Fenerbahçe lost in the EuroLeague semifinal game to Real Madrid, by a score of 87–96.

Before the start of the 2015–16 season, he was named the team's captain, after departure of Emir Preldžić. In 2016, Fenerbahçe won the Turkish Cup, with a 67–65 win over Darüşşafaka. Fenerbahçe also reached the final game of the 2016 Euroleague Final Four, but fell short of winning the EuroLeague championship, after an overtime 96–101 loss to CSKA Moscow. Over 18 EuroLeague games, he averaged 4 points per game. At the end of the season, Fenerbahçe also won the Turkish League championship.

On 27 September  2016 he signed a three-year contract extension with the team.

In 2017–18 EuroLeague, Fenerbahçe made it to the 2018 EuroLeague Final Four, its fourth consecutive Final Four appearance. Eventually, they lost to Real Madrid with 80–85 in the final game.

International career
With the junior national teams of Turkey, Mahmutoğlu played at the 2006 FIBA Europe Under-16 Championship, at the 2007 FIBA Europe Under-18 Championship, and the 2008 FIBA Europe Under-18 Championship, at the 2009 and at the 2010 FIBA Europe Under-20 Championships. He also played for the Turkish national team, and won the gold medal, at the 2013 Mediterranean Games.

He also played with the senior Turkish national basketball team at the EuroBasket 2015.

Career statistics

EuroLeague

|-
| style="text-align:left;"| 2013–14
| style="text-align:left;" rowspan=6| Fenerbahçe
| 22 || 7 || 14.5 || .448 || .415 || .923 || 1.2 || .6 || .5 || .0 || 5.5 || 3.6
|-
| style="text-align:left;"| 2014–15
| 16 || 2 || 7.4 || .351 || .393 || .000 || .7 || .3 || .0 || .0 || 2.3 || .8
|-
| style="text-align:left;"| 2015–16
| 18 || 2 || 12.2 || .410 || .404 || .500 || .7 || .4 || .2 || .0 || 4.0 || 1.5
|-
| style="text-align:left;background:#AFE6BA;"| 2016–17†
| 20 || 4 || 10.4 || .426 || .438 || 1.000 || .5 || .6 || .3 || .0 || 4.0 || 2.6
|-
| style="text-align:left;"| 2017–18
| 21 || 4 || 6.7 || .325 || .286 || 1.000 || .5 || .2 || .1 || .0 || 1.7 || .6
|-
| style="text-align:left;"| 2018–19
| 31 || 5 || 12.0 || .508 || .461 || .950 || .8 || .5 || .2 || .0 || 5.6 || 4.4
|- class="sortbottom"
| align="center" colspan="2"| Career
| 128 || 24 || 10.8 || .407 || .417 || .932 || .8 || .5 || .2 || .0 || 4.0 || 2.5

Personal life
Mahmutoğlu, whose original surname was Brničanin, originates from Serbia's southwestern city of Novi Pazar. He is of Bosniak origin.

References

External links

Melih Mahmutoğlu at draftexpress.com
Melih Mahmutoğlu at eurobasket.com
Melih Mahmutoğlu at euroleague.net
Melih Mahmutoğlu at tblstat.net

1990 births
Living people
Antalya Büyükşehir Belediyesi players
Competitors at the 2013 Mediterranean Games
Darüşşafaka Basketbol players
Erdemirspor players
Fenerbahçe men's basketball players
Galatasaray S.K. (men's basketball) players
Mediterranean Games gold medalists for Turkey
Mediterranean Games medalists in basketball
Pertevniyal S.K. players
Shooting guards
Basketball players from Istanbul
Turkish men's basketball players
Turkish people of Bosniak descent
2019 FIBA Basketball World Cup players